Brendan O'Carroll (born 17 September 1955) is an Irish actor, comedian, director, producer and writer. He is best known for portraying foul-mouthed matriarch Agnes Brown on stage and in the BBC and RTÉ television sitcom Mrs. Brown's Boys. In 2015, O'Carroll was awarded the Irish Film and Television Academy Lifetime Achievement Award for his contribution to the Irish television.

Early life
The youngest of 11 children, O'Carroll was born in Finglas, Dublin. His mother, Maureen, was a Labour Party TD and his father, Gerard O'Carroll, was a carpenter. His father died in 1962 when O'Carroll was six, and Brendan's mother raised their eleven children with little money. He attended Saint Gabriel's National School and left at the age of 12. He had a string of occupations; these included being a waiter and a milkman.

Career

Early career
Having become well known as a comedy guest on The Late Late Show, O'Carroll released four stand-up videos, titled How's your Raspberry Ripple, How's your Jolly Roger, How's your Snowballs and How's your Wibbly Wobbly Wonder.

O'Carroll wrote the screenplay to Sparrow's Trap, a boxing movie. The film, which had Stephen Rea cast in the lead role, ran into financing difficulties midway through the shoot when the distributor withdrew and it was abandoned. Incurring debts of over €1 million, O'Carroll became bankrupt and the film has never been produced.

O'Carroll presented a quiz show, called Hot Milk and Pepper, on RTÉ One, with long-term collaborator Gerry Browne.

Mrs. Brown's Boys
In 1992, O'Carroll performed a short radio play titled Mrs. Brown's Boys and shortly afterwards he wrote four books titled The Mammy, The Granny, The Chisellers and The Scrapper. In 1999, a movie named Agnes Browne, starring Anjelica Huston, was released, based on his book "The Mammy". O'Carroll also co-wrote the screenplay. He then decided to put together his own family theatre company, Mrs. Browne's Boys, and dressed up as a woman to play his part, as the actress he had originally hired didn't show up.

From 1999 to 2009, he wrote and performed in five plays. Since 2011, the stage shows have been re-toured across the UK. In 2011, his plays were adapted into a television sitcom (with the name "Browne" shortened to "Brown"). So far, from 2011, 28 episodes have aired, across three series, several Christmas-special episodes and a one-off live episode that aired in 2016 on RTÉ One and BBC One. Mrs. Brown's Boys D'Movie was released on 27 June 2014, and was a significant success in the UK, staying at number one in the box office for two consecutive weeks. However, the film had negative reviews; one saying it was not just unfunny but "close to anti-funny". O'Carroll's wife, his sister Eilish, his son Danny, and his daughter Fiona all appear or have appeared on episodes of Mrs. Brown's Boys.

The Course
It was announced in January 2015 that the BBC wanted O'Carroll to do "other stuff", due to the fact that Mrs Brown's Boys had become so successful. He revealed plans to adapt his first ever written play, patser grey into a television sitcom.

Family and personal life
O'Carroll was married to his first wife from 1977 to 1999. He married Jennifer Gibney in 2005. They live in Davenport, Florida. O'Carroll has three surviving children, including Fiona and Danny.

O'Carroll's paternal grandfather Peter O'Carroll, a father of seven and a prominent republican, was shot dead on 16 October 1920 at his home in Manor Street, Dublin. Two of his sons were Irish Republican Army volunteers. The incident was investigated in the television series Who Do You Think You Are?

In March 2016 O'Carroll appeared in the BBC2 documentary Brendan O'Carroll – My Family at War, which explored the involvement of three of his uncles—Liam, James and Peadar O'Carroll—in the Easter Rising.

O'Carroll published his autobiography, Call Me Mrs Brown, in 2022.

Filmography

Film

Television

Stage

References

External links

1955 births
Living people
20th-century Irish comedians
20th-century Irish male actors
20th-century Irish male writers
20th-century Irish novelists
21st-century Irish comedians
21st-century Irish male actors
21st-century Irish male writers
21st-century Irish novelists
Irish autobiographers
Irish male comedians
Irish male film actors
Irish male novelists
Irish male stage actors
Irish male television actors
Irish stand-up comedians
Male actors from Dublin (city)
Mensans
People from Finglas
RTÉ television presenters